Bonaventure Hepburn  (born James Hepburn; 14 July 1573, East Lothian – October 1620 or 1621, Venice, Italy) was a Scottish Roman Catholic linguist, lexicographer, philologist and biblical commentator. He was a scholar of some renown and rose to the post of Keeper of Oriental Books and Manuscripts at the Vatican.

In 1591 he published a work on his study of the Hebrew language and in 1616 his work on other foreign languages was published as The Heavenly Golden Rod of the Blessed Virgin Mary in Seventy-two Praises (also known as Virga Aurea), a listing of 72 different alphabets. He was also known for translating into the Latin language the Kettar Malcuth of Rabbi Solomon.

Early life
The son of Thomas Hepburn, the rector of Oldhamstocks, James was brought up as a Protestant. After his studied at St Andrews University he converted to the Catholic Church, lived in France and Italy, and travelled extensively, through "Turkey, Persia, Syria, Palestine, Egypt, Ethiopia, and most of the eastern countries". He then joined the Order of Minims at Avignon.

See also
 Vatican Library

References

1573 births
1621 deaths
16th-century Scottish Roman Catholic priests
17th-century Scottish Roman Catholic priests
People from Oldhamstocks
Alumni of the University of St Andrews
Christian Hebraists
Christian scholars
Converts to Roman Catholicism from Calvinism
Grammarians of Arabic
Minims (religious order)
British biblical scholars
Roman Catholic friars
Roman Catholic biblical scholars
Scottish expatriates in France
Scottish expatriates in Italy
Scottish explorers
Scottish lexicographers
Scottish librarians
Scottish linguists
Scottish orientalists
Scottish philologists
Scottish translators
Vatican City scholars